= Nurneysville, Virginia =

Unincorporated community in Suffolk, Virginia, United States

Coordinates: 36°39′22″N 76°38′15″W

Nurneysville is an unincorporated community in the independent city of Suffolk, Virginia, United States.
